The Bates Tourist Court is a historic traveler's accommodation on Fair Street in Marshall, Arkansas.  The property includes four buildings, three of which are stone-veneered wood-frame cabins.  The fourth building, which original housed the office, has been substantially altered since the facility was built about 1935.  The property is rare within Searcy County as a surviving example of 1930s road-based tourist architecture.

The property was listed on the National Register of Historic Places in 1993.

See also
National Register of Historic Places listings in Searcy County, Arkansas

References

Hotel buildings on the National Register of Historic Places in Arkansas
Buildings and structures completed in 1935
Buildings and structures in Searcy County, Arkansas
National Register of Historic Places in Searcy County, Arkansas